Jamie Charles Cann (28 June 1946 – 15 October 2001) was a British Labour Party politician who was the Leader of Ipswich Borough Council from 1979 to 1991, before being elected as the Member of Parliament (MP) for Ipswich at the 1992 general election, a seat he held until his death in 2001.

Early and family life
He was educated at Barton-upon-Humber Grammar School and Kesteven College of Education. He then became a primary school teacher, serving as deputy headmaster of Handford Hall Primary School in Ipswich from 1981 to 1992.

Political career
Cann voted against equalising the age of consent for same-sex relations. In 1998, he was fined £1,000, and disqualified from driving for eighteen months for drink driving.

Renowned as an MP with acerbic wit, he spent most of his time campaigning in the constituency. As leader of Ipswich Borough Council, he was noted as a reformer and helped make Ipswich a model local authority.

He died of liver disease, in October 2001, just four months after being re-elected at the 2001 general election, and following a spell in hospital in Cambridge. The subsequent by-election for Ipswich was held on 22 November and was retained for the Labour Party by the new candidate Chris Mole. A retirement home on the Ravenswood development in Ipswich was named in Cann's honour following his death.

References

External links
 
 TheyWorkForYou.com

Members of the Parliament of the United Kingdom for Ipswich
Labour Party (UK) MPs for English constituencies
UK MPs 1992–1997
UK MPs 1997–2001
UK MPs 2001–2005
1946 births
2001 deaths
Councillors in Suffolk
People from Barton-upon-Humber